Phạm Quốc Khánh (born 2 September 1990) is a wushu athlete from Vietnam.

Career 
Khánh's first major international victory was at the 2006 Asian Games, where he won the silver medal in men's nanquan. A year later, he became the world champion in nanquan at the 2007 World Wushu Championships. He also won the silver medal in nanquan at the 2007 Southeast Asian Games. Two years later, he competed in the 2009 Southeast Asian Games and was able to win the gold medal in nanquan. Almost a year later at the 2010 Asian Games, he won the bronze medal in men's nanquan. 

At the 2011 Southeast Asian Games, he won another silver medal in nanquan. Two years later, he won a silver medal in nangun at the 2013 World Wushu Championships followed by a gold medal in the same event and a bronze medal in nandao at the 2013 Southeast Asian Games. At the 2015 Southeast Asian Games, he won another silver medal in nanquan. 

Two years later, he was a double silver medalist at the 2017 Southeast Asian Games, achieving victories in nanquan and nandao. At the 2017 World Wushu Championships, he won the bronze medal in nanquan. He was able to qualify for the 2018 Taolu World Cup and went on to win a silver in nanquan. That same year, he won the silver medal in men's nanquan at the 2018 Asian Games. At the 2019 Southeast Asian Games, he was a double medalist, winning the gold medal in nanquan and a bronze medal in nandao and nangun combined. At the 2021 Southeast Asian Games, he won the gold medal in nandao and a silver medal in nangun and declared his retirement.

References 

1990 births
Living people
Vietnamese wushu practitioners
Wushu practitioners at the 2006 Asian Games
Wushu practitioners at the 2010 Asian Games
Wushu practitioners at the 2014 Asian Games
Wushu practitioners at the 2018 Asian Games
Medalists at the 2006 Asian Games
Medalists at the 2010 Asian Games
Medalists at the 2018 Asian Games
Asian Games silver medalists for Vietnam
Asian Games bronze medalists for Vietnam
Asian Games medalists in wushu
Southeast Asian Games gold medalists for Vietnam
Southeast Asian Games silver medalists for Vietnam
Southeast Asian Games bronze medalists for Vietnam
Southeast Asian Games medalists in wushu
Sportspeople from Hanoi
Competitors at the 2007 Southeast Asian Games
Competitors at the 2009 Southeast Asian Games
Competitors at the 2011 Southeast Asian Games
Competitors at the 2013 Southeast Asian Games
Competitors at the 2015 Southeast Asian Games
Competitors at the 2017 Southeast Asian Games
Competitors at the 2021 Southeast Asian Games